The AeroVironment RQ-14 Dragon Eye is a small reconnaissance miniature UAV developed by the Naval Research Laboratory and the Marine Corps Warfighting Laboratory for use by the United States Marine Corps.

Design and development

It is a tailless design with a rectangular wing and twin props. It can be launched by hand or using a store-bought bungee cord. It also uses a break-apart system to increase durability—parts of the plane break apart instead of shattering and can be reattached later or replaced with new parts. It has a GPS-INS-based waypoint navigation system.

The operator monitors Dragon Eye operation through "video goggles" connected to a laptop computer.

The Dragon Eye aircraft is used primarily for scouting urban areas, and is especially useful in urban assaults. Its camera, when used with a trained Marine, can be used to spot enemies without alerting them to the UAV's presence.

The production contract for Dragon Eye was awarded to AeroVironment in 2003, and over 1000 aircraft were built before the Marines switched over to another UCAV of AeroVironment (RQ-11 Raven B) for the remainder of the Dragon Eye production contract.

The Dragon Eye has been used in Iraq, post-invasion, from 2003–present.

General characteristics

References

External links

 AeroVironment Dragon Eye
 Project description - from U.S. Joint Forces Command.
 Dragoneye Update
 Mini and Micro UAVs
 AeroVironment, Inc.

Q-14R
Airborne military robots
2000s United States military reconnaissance aircraft
Unmanned military aircraft of the United States
Aircraft first flown in 2001